Funastrum cynanchoides (formerly called Sarcostemma cynanchoides), also known as fringed twinevine, twining milkweed or climbing milkweed, is a perennial plant in the family Apocynaceae that grows twining through other plants in the Mojave Desert and Sonoran Desert. It has milky sap and smells pungent. It is similar to Funastrum hirtellum.

Description
It is a twining vine-like plant that grows over other shrubs.

Distribution and habitat
It can be found from Southern California to Utah, Oklahoma and Texas. It grows at the edge of desert dry washes in the eastern Mojave Desert and Sonoran Desert at altitudes below .

In urban areas the vine freely climbs on plants, trees, as well as having a preference for chain-link fencing in neglected areas.

Ecology
The flowers are actively visited and fed on by butterflies, similar to other milkweeds.

References

External links

Calflora Database: ''Funastrum cynanchoides  (Fringed twinevine)
 USDA Plants Profile for Funastrum cynanchoides (fringed twinevine)

Asclepiadoideae
North American desert flora
Vines
Flora of the California desert regions
Flora of the Sonoran Deserts
Flora of Mexico
Flora of the South-Central United States
Flora of the Southwestern United States
Natural history of the Colorado Desert
Natural history of the Mojave Desert
Butterfly food plants
Flora without expected TNC conservation status
Taxa named by Joseph Decaisne